William Cadbury may refer to:
 William Adlington Barrow Cadbury, English businessman
 William Warder Cadbury, American physician, professor and medical missionary